Simon Robert Livett (born 8 January 1969) is an English former football midfielder.

Livett started his career at West Ham United. He made his debut in a Second Division game against Wolverhampton Wanderers on 15 September 1990, as a replacement for the injured Stuart Slater, although he himself was struck but an injury that saw him substituted at half-time. He played in one other competitive game, an FA Cup 3rd Round game against Aldershot on 5 January 1991, and also played a Full Members' Cup game against Luton Town.

Livett joined Leyton Orient on a free transfer on 10 August 1992. He also played for Cambridge United, Dagenham & Redbridge, Southend United, Dover and Boston United.

References

External links

Romford profile at Romford Archive
Profile at San Diego Flash

1969 births
Living people
English footballers
Association football midfielders
West Ham United F.C. players
Leyton Orient F.C. players
Cambridge United F.C. players
Dagenham & Redbridge F.C. players
Dover Athletic F.C. players
Romford F.C. players
Billericay Town F.C. players
Grays Athletic F.C. players
Southend United F.C. players
Boston United F.C. players
San Diego Flash players
Redbridge F.C. players
English Football League players
Footballers from East Ham
Dover F.C. players
Expatriate footballers in Finland
Expatriate soccer players in the United States
English expatriate footballers
USL First Division players
English expatriate sportspeople in the United States